The post of Archdeacon of Chichester was created in the 12th century, although the Diocese of Sussex was founded by St Wilfrid, the exiled Bishop of York, in AD 681. The original location of the see was in Selsey. The see was 
moved to Chichester, in about 1075, by decree of the Synod of London. Currently, Luke Irvine-Capel is the Archdeacon (since May 2019).

History
After the Norman Conquest a uniform system of territorial archdeaconries was created to try to ensure that no settlement was more than a day's ride from the bishop's seat. In 1070 the Council of Windsor decreed that bishops should appoint archdeacons to their churches. The archdeacon acted as the bishop's deputy and representative and had the job of supervising parish churches in the diocese.

Saint Richard, Bishop of Chichester in the 13th century, produced a body of statutes which included the duties of his archdeacons: "They were to administer justice for their proper fees, not demanding more for the expedition or delay of business. They were to visit the churches regularly to see the services were duly celebrated, the vessels and vestments in proper order, the canon of mass correctly followed and distinctly read."

The modern role of an archdeacon in the Church of England has not changed significantly since St Richard's time; their  
main function is to be involved with legal and practical matters concerning visitations, clergy care, discipline matters, faculties and quinquennial inspections.

The Diocese of Chichester almost exactly covers the two counties of East Sussex and West Sussex and the City of Brighton and Hove, stretching for nearly a hundred miles (160 km) along the south coast of England. The diocese has four archdeaconries, namely the Archdeaconry of Horsham, the Archdeaconry of Hastings, the Archdeaconry of Brighton and Lewes as well as the Archdeaconry of Chichester.

From its creation, in the 12th century until 2002, the Archdeacon of Chichester was actually based in Chichester. In 2002 during Archdeacon McKittrick's tenure, the base was moved to Church House, Hove, East Sussex. It returned to Chichester, following the appointment of Luke Irvine-Capel, in May 2019.

List of archdeacons

High Medieval
Sole archdeacons:
bef. 1118–aft. 1118: Ricoard
bef. 1122–aft. 1123: Henry
11th century: Roger
?–aft. 1147: Robert
Senior archdeacons:
bef. 1157–aft. 1172: Henry
bef. 1172–1178 (res.): Seffrid II
bef. 1180–aft. 1180: Matthew of Chichester
–aft. 1192: Peter
aft. 1192–bef. 1197: Richard
Archdeacons of Chichester:
bef. 1198–aft. 1213: Silvester
bef. 1220–aft. 1229: William Durand
bef. 1232–aft. 1234: William
bef. 1235–aft. 1239: Walter
bef. 1242–aft. 1246: John Climping
bef. 1247–aft. 1256: John de Reigate
1259–aft. 1275: Geoffrey de Gates
bef. 1287–bef. 1289: Robert of Wiston
bef. 1300–aft. 1307: Gervase of Séez

Late Medieval
bef. 1311–bef. 1340 (d.): Robert Leyset/de Leycester
bef. 1346–1350 (d.): John Langley
May 1350–aft. 1350: Adam de Houton
bef. 1354–24 December 1356 (exch.): Simon de Bredon
24 December 1356 – 7 March 1357 (exch.): Walter de Alderbury
7 March 1357–?: John de Sculthorpe
1358–1359: John Pipe
1366: Robert de Walton
?–bef. 1370 (d.): Henry Folvyle
3 July 1370 – 15 April 1382 (exch.): William Wardene/Wardieu
15 April 1382 – 3 May 1395 (exch.): Simon Russell
5 June 1388–?: Lambert Threkingham (ineffective royal grant)
3 May 1395–bef. 1413 (d.): John Thomas
1398: William Read
18 December 1404–?: Thomas Harlyng (mistaken collation)
13 November 1413–bef. 1440: John Lindfield/Lyndefeld
?–1439 (exch.): John Faukes
5 December 1440–bef. 1444 (res.): William Walesby
7 February 1444–bef. 1460 (d.): William Normanton
1454: Simon de Gredon/Gredon
bef. 1459–bef. 1464: John Sprever
bef. 1464–bef. 1478 (res.): John Doget
bef. 1478–bef. 1481 (res.): Peter Huse/Husy
1 September 1481 – 1482 (res.): Henry Boleyn

bef. 1484–bef. 1494 (d.): John Coke/Cooke
bef. 1495–bef. 1509 (d.): Gerard Borrett/Burrell
18 April 1509–bef. 1512 (res.): Robert Chapel
4 April 1512–bef. 1532: William Norbury
2 February 1532–bef. 1554: John Worthiall

Early modern
16 April 1555–bef. 1559 (deprived): Alban Langdale
7 October 1559–?: Richard Tremayne (ineffective royal grant)
20 May 1560–bef. 1571 (d.): Thomas Spencer
July 1571–bef. 1575 (res.): John Coldwell
15 May 1575–bef. 1580 (res.): Thomas Gillingham
April 1580–bef. 1586 (res.): John Langworth
15 November 1586–March 1596 (d.): William Stone
12 April 1596 – 30 March 1603 (d.): Henry Ball
7 September 1603–bef. 1607 (d.): Thomas Pattenson
17 February 1608–bef. 1635 (d.): Roger Andrewes
24 November 1635–bef. 1640 (d.): Laurence Pay
18 February 1640 – 1641 (res.): James Marsh
bef. 1642–25 April 1660 (d.): Henry Hammond
2 July 1660 – 6 December 1672 (d.): Jasper Mayne
23 December 1672–bef. 1679 (d.): Oliver Whitby
24 September 1679–bef. 1707 (d.): Josiah Pleydell 
12 February 1708 – 17 August 1736 (d.): James Barker
7 September 1736 – 14 July 1770 (d.): Thomas Ball
10 June 1771 – 1 August 1792 (d.): Thomas Hollingbery
3 October 1792 – 1797 (res.): John Buckner
15 May 1802 – 10 September 1803 (d.): Charles Alcock
12 October 1803 – 4 January 1808 (d.): Thomas Taylor
5 March 1808–bef. 1840 (res.): Charles Webber
30 December 1840 – 21 March 1851 (res.): Henry Edward Manning (became Archbishop of Westminster in the Roman Catholic Church)
28 April 1851 – 26 March 1879 (d.): James Garbett

Late modern
1879–31 October 1887 (d.): John Russell Walker
1887–9 May 1903 (d.): Francis Mount
1903–1914 (res.): Edward Elwes
1914–19 February 1920 (d.): Herbert Jones (also Bishop of Lewes)
1920–1934 (ret.): Benedict Hoskyns
1934–1946 (ret.): Charles Clarke
1946–1973 (ret.): Lancelot Mason
1973–1975 (res.): Frederick Kerr-Dineen
1975–1981 (res.): Richard Eyre
1981–1991 (ret.): Keith Hobbs
1991–2002 (ret.): Michael Brotherton
20021 July 2018 (ret.): Douglas McKittrick
1 May 20189 May 2019 Mark Standen & David Twinley (Initially shadowed previous Archdeacon, then jointly acting)
9 May 2019present Luke Irvine-Capel

See also
Chichester Cathedral
Diocese of Chichester
Deans of Chichester
Selsey Abbey

Notes

References

Sources

	

	

	

 
History of West Sussex
Lists of English people
Church of England
Anglican ecclesiastical offices
Lists of Anglicans